The 2016 Men's European Volleyball League was the 13th edition of the annual Men's European Volleyball League, which features men's national volleyball teams from eight European countries.

A preliminary league round was played from 3 to 20 June 2016, and the final four tournament, which was held at Varna, Bulgaria.

Estonia defeated Macedonia 3–0 in the final.

Teams

League round
All times are local.

Pool A

|}

Week 1
Venue:  Palace of Culture and Sports, Varna, Bulgaria

|}

Week 2
Venue:  Boris Trajkovski Sports Center, Skopje, Macedonia

|}

Pool B

|}

Week 1
Venue:  Sporthalle, Enns, Austria

|}

Week 2
Venue:  Rakvere Spordihall, Rakvere, Estonia

|}

Final four
The top placed team from each group and the best second-placed team qualified for the final four. The fourth participant was the organizer of the tournament.

Qualified teams
 (Host)

Bracket
All times are local

Semifinals

|}

Third place game

|}

Final

|}

Final standings

Awards

Most Valuable Player
   Robert Täht
Best Setter
  Kert Toobal
Best Outside Spikers
  Robert Täht
  Alexander Berger

Best Middle Blockers
  Svetoslav Gotsev
  Peter Wohlfahrtstätter
Best Opposite Spiker
  Nikola Gjorgiev
Best Libero
   Rait Rikberg

References

External links
Official website

See also
2016 Women's European Volleyball League

2016 Men
European Volleyball League
International volleyball competitions hosted by Bulgaria